How to Make a Monster is a 1958 American horror film drama, produced and written by Herman Cohen, directed by Herbert L. Strock, and starring Gary Conway, Robert H. Harris, Paul Brinegar, Morris Ankrum, Robert Shayne, and John Ashley. The film was released by American International Pictures as a double feature with Teenage Caveman.

The film is a follow-up to both I Was a Teenage Werewolf and I Was a Teenage Frankenstein. Like Teenage Frankenstein, a black-and-white film that switches to color in its final moments, How to Make a Monster was filmed in black-and-white and only the last reel (the fire scene finale) is in full color.

Plot
Pete Dumond, chief make-up artist for 25 years at American International Studios, will be laid off after the studio is purchased by NBN Associates. The new management from the East, Jeffrey Clayton and John Nixon, plan to make musicals and comedies instead of the horror pictures for which Pete has created his remarkable monster make-ups and made the studio famous. (The new owners show Pete one of their new rock musical numbers on stage which features real-life singing superstar John Ashley.) In retaliation, Pete vows to use the very monsters these men have rejected to destroy them. 

By mixing a numbing ingredient into his foundation cream and persuading the young actors that their careers are through unless they place themselves in his power, he hypnotizes both the unsuspecting Larry Drake and Tony Mantell (who are playing the characters the Teenage Werewolf and the Teenage Frankenstein, respectively, in the picture Werewolf Meets Frankenstein, currently shooting on the lot).

Through hypnosis, Pete urges Larry, in Teenage werewolf make-up, to kill Nixon in the studio projection room. Later, he orders the unknowing Tony, in Teenage Frankenstein make-up, to attack Clayton and choke him to death after he arrives home at night in his 1958 Lincoln convertible. Next day, studio guard Monahan, an amateur detective, stops in at the make-up room. He shows Pete and Rivero, Pete's make-up assistant, his little black book in which he has jotted down many interesting facts, such as the late time (9:12PM) Pete and Rivero checked out the night of Jeffrey Clayton's murder. He explains he hopes to work his way up to chief of security on the lot. Apprehensive, Pete makes himself up as a terrifying split-faced Caveman, one of his own creations and kills Monahan in the studio commissary while Monhan makes his rounds that night.

Richards, the older guard, sees and hears nothing of the struggle, but discovers the missing Monahan's body. Police investigators uncover two clues: a maid, Millie, describes Frankenstein's monster (Tony, in make-up), who struck her down as he fled from the scene of Clayton's murder, and the police laboratory technician discovers a peculiar ingredient in the make-up left on Clayton's fingernails from his death struggle with Tony. The formula matches bits found in Pete's old make-up room. 

The police head for Pete's house. Pete has taken Rivero, Larry and Tony to his home for a grim farewell party, his house being a museum of all the monsters that he created in his 25 years at the studio. Pete, distrusting Rivero, stabs him to death when they are alone in the kitchen. Learning that Larry and Tony are trying to leave the locked living room, he attacks them both with the knife. 

Larry awkwardly knocks over a candelabra, setting the monster museum on fire, and Pete is burned to death, trying in vain to save the heads of his monstrous "children" mounted on the walls. The police break through the locked door just before the flames reach the boys, and they save Larry and Tony.

Cast
 Robert H. Harris as Pete Dumond
 Gary Conway as Tony Mantell / the Teenage Frankenstein
 Gary Clarke as Larry Drake / the Teenage Werewolf
 Paul Brinegar as Rivero
 Malcolm Atterbury as Security Guard Richards
 Dennis Cross as Security Guard Monahan
 Morris Ankrum as Police Capt. Hancock
 Walter Reed as Detective Thompson
 Paul Maxwell as Jeffrey Clayton
 Eddie Marr as John Nixon
 Heather Ames as Arlene Dow
 Robert Shayne as Gary Droz
 John Phillips as Detective Jones
 Paulene Myers as Millie
 John Ashley as himself

Production
 
Many of Pete Dumond's "children" destroyed in the fire were props originally created by Paul Blaisdell for earlier AIP films, and he actually allowed the props to be destroyed. They include The Cat Girl (1956), "Beulah" from It Conquered the World (1956), Invasion of the Saucer Men (1957) and the Dr. Jekyll mask from Attack of the Puppet People (1958). Blaisdell also created a brand new monster costume he dubbed "Aunt Esmeralda" which he created specifically to be burned in the fire scene (designed so that as the face melted, a grisly skull was revealed underneath). Blaisdell's She-Creature mask was also in the scene but miraculously was not destroyed. 

Blaisdell had specifically asked AIP not to burn his Cat Girl mask, but it was carelessly destroyed in the fire anyway. (To compound the tragedy, the cameraman failed to film the Cat Girl mask as it was burning.) The whole incident left a bad taste in Blaisdell's mouth.

Herman Cohen says he cast John Ashley as a singer at the request of James H. Nicholson, who had just put Ashley under a long-term contract with the studio. Ashley was having some minor success as a recording artist at the time.

AIP did not have a physical studio, so the film was shot at Ziv Studios. During production there, a sign was put up that called the studio lot "American International Studios", which was totally misleading.

Ed Wood's widow Kathy claimed in a 1992 interview that her husband always felt that the idea for How To Make a Monster was stolen from him by AIP producer Sam Arkoff. She said "Eddie condemned Arkoff, he really hated him. Eddie gave them a script for approval, and they changed the characters a little bit around. Eddie had written it for Lugosi. It was about this old horror actor who couldn't get work any more, so he took his vengeance out on the studio. (They changed it to) a make-up man who takes revenge on a studio." Arkoff denied Wood's claim was true, stating that Herman Cohen originated the entire project on his own.

Other releases

Scream Factory's 2020 Blu-ray release features an audio commentary by Tom Weaver.

Svengoolie featured the film on June 12, 2021, again on December 11, 2021, and on June 25, 2022.

References

External links

 

1958 films
1958 horror films
1950s teen films
American International Pictures films
Films about actors
Films directed by Herbert L. Strock
American werewolf films
Films scored by Paul Dunlap
American black-and-white films
Films partially in color
Mad scientist films
1950s English-language films
1950s American films